Randall Hope (born 4 April 1943) is an Australian boxer. He competed in the men's featherweight event at the 1964 Summer Olympics. At the 1964 Summer Olympics, he lost to Charles Brown of the United States.

References

1943 births
Living people
Australian male boxers
Olympic boxers of Australia
Boxers at the 1964 Summer Olympics
Place of birth missing (living people)
Featherweight boxers